Christian Baciotti, also known as Baciotti, is a French-based singer and musician. His 1977 electronic disco track "Black Jack", featured in an album and released as a single, ranked No. 42 on the 1978 Italian music charts.

In 1978, Baciotti released a second album, Moody Blue Rendez-Vous.

References

External links
Baciotti on Discogs
Baciotti on Rate Your Music

Date of birth missing (living people)
Disco musicians
English-language singers from France
Living people
Year of birth missing (living people)